Acrobasis minorella is a species of snout moth in the genus Acrobasis. It was described by Aristide Caradja in 1910. It is found in Algeria.

References

Moths described in 1910
Acrobasis
Endemic fauna of Algeria
Moths of Africa
Taxa named by Aristide Caradja